Theresa Deas  (born 1963) is an Australian former soccer player who played for the Australia women's national soccer team between 1980 and 1988.

Theresa represented Victoria at the AWSA National championships from 1978 to 1998, winning the National championships on 2 occasions. She was inducted into the FFA Hall of Fame in 2003. Deas was inducted into the Football Federation Victoria (FFV) Hall of Fame in 2011 and is a life member of FFV.  Since retiring as a player, she has been actively involved in player development, administration, coaching and the formation of WNPL Clubs in Victoria.

References 

1963 births
Australian women's soccer players
Australia women's international soccer players
Living people
Women's association football goalkeepers
Recipients of the Australian Sports Medal
Sportswomen from Victoria (Australia)